William Batt Maslen (1 January 1916 – 8 October 1974) was an Australian rules footballer who played with St Kilda in the Victorian Football League (VFL).

Notes

External links 

Bill Maslen's playing statistics from The VFA Project

1916 births
1974 deaths
Australian rules footballers from Victoria (Australia)
St Kilda Football Club players
Preston Football Club (VFA) players